Zynx Health Incorporated is an American corporation, formed in 1996, which specializes in providing evidence-based clinical decision support system products. These are made available at the point of patient care, through electronic health record (EHR) systems. 

Based in Los Angeles, the company serves over 1,900 hospitals and outpatient practices globally. Most, however, are located in the US. As of 2012, Zynx Health products and services impact over 50% of hospital discharges in the US.

Because of this, the company's on care delivery proportional to its size, Healthcare Informatics named it one of the “Most Interesting Vendors” in 2011, and included it on its HCI 100 list. Modern Healthcare named Zynx Health one of the “Best Places to Work in Healthcare” in 2011.

As of 2004, it is a subsidiary of Hearst Corporation.

History 
In 1996, a group of clinicians at Cedars-Sinai Medical Center founded Zynx Health as a wholly owned subsidiary of the hospital.

On May 1, 2002, Zynx Health was acquired by Cerner for $15 million in cash and $8.5 million in software credits. In 2004, the company was acquired by Hearst Corporation. In 2004, Zynx Health moved its offices from its original Beverly Hills, CA, location to its current location in Los Angeles, CA.

On March 30, 2017, Zynx Health partnered with Healthwise, a health education, technology, and services company.

Products and Services 
Most Zynx Health products are delivered through software as a service and are customized by the end user using patented online interfaces. Currently, Zynx Health produces five products related to clinical decision support.

ZynxOrder is a system used by hospitals for developing and maintaining order sets based on clinical evidence, making use of rules, reminders, and other tools to assist with physician decision-making. ZynxCare is a care plan development system designed for hospital nursing staff and interdisciplinary teams, helping clinicians create evidence-based plans of care. ZynxAmbulatory is an evidence-based order set development system designed for outpatient physicians, also making use of clinical rules and reminders. ZynxEvidence is an online database of clinical evidence drawn from medical and interdisciplinary literature, peer-reviewed research, and national guidelines and performance measures, and is the content foundation on which other Zynx Health products are based. Access to the database is provided to client hospitals and outpatient centers as a reference resource.

References 

Health care companies based in California
Electronic health records